The Wisconsin Union is a membership organization at the University of Wisconsin–Madison. It operates the Memorial Union, Union South, the Morgridge Center for Public Service, the Hoofer Equestrian Center, Bernie's Place Child Care Center, and a number of food outlets on campus in order to "provide a common life and cultivated social program for its members." Anyone who is approved can join the Wisconsin Union by paying a membership fee. All UW students are members and recent graduates are offered a substantial discount on a life membership. Members receive certain benefits and privileges not accorded the general public. The services and activities provided fall roughly into the three categories of social education, facilities, and retail services.

Social education 
As the UW–Madison's Division of Social Education, the Wisconsin Union serves as the "living room of the campus" where students, faculty, staff, and community members can meet, interact, and learn from each other outside of the classroom. A craftshop offers tools, supplies, and space for crafts such as pottery, photography, and woodworking. The Wisconsin Hoofers outdoor recreation clubs offer instruction, equipment, and opportunities to participate in a wide variety of outdoor activities. The Union Theater hosts concerts, lectures, and movies. Mini-Courses offers a variety of general-interest enrichment classes. Students can learn leadership and governance by serving in one of the committees of the Union Directorate, the student programming board. The music committee brings a full schedule of live acts to the Union Terrace, der Rathskeller, and Union South. The art committee gives students a chance to curate exhibits for the Union galleries and around the buildings.

Facilities
Student groups, faculty, departments and members can reserve rooms within the two Union buildings and selected sites in other campus buildings through the Central Reservations Office for meetings, conferences, dances, dinners, weddings, or many other events. Organizations such as the Associated Students of Madison student government and the Campus Women's Center have permanent office space in the Memorial Union. For large presentations and shows, the Wisconsin Union Theater can be rented.

Food and retail 

The food and retail operations encompass numerous restaurant and deli locations throughout the campus, two gift shops, a bar in der Rathskeller, games room, outdoor equipment rental, and full-service catering.

External links
 Wisconsin Union website
 The Wisconsin Union—The First 75 Years (1904-79), interviews with Wisconsin Union Director Porter F. Butts
 Constitution of the Wisconsin Union
 Bylaws of the Wisconsin Union

References 

University of Wisconsin–Madison